Anticlinal may refer to:

Anticline, in structural geology, an anticline is a fold that is convex up and has its oldest beds at its core
Anticlinal, in stereochemistry, a torsion angle between 90° to 150°, and –90° to –150°; see Alkane_stereochemistry

See also
Weald–Artois Anticline
Mareuil Anticline
La Tour-Blanche Anticline
Usk Anticline
Fold (geology)
Detachment fold
Stereochemistry